The Marriage of Rosine (French: Le mariage de Rosine) is a 1926 French silent film directed by Pierre Colombier.

Cast
 Ady Cresso as Fanny Desroses  
 Jean Dehelly as Piccolo  
 Josyane as Rosine  
 André Lefaur as Le couturier Pommier

References

Bibliography 
 Henri Bousquet. De Pathé Frères à Pathé Cinéma: 1923, 1924, 1925, 1926, 1927. Bousquet, 2004.

External links 
 

1926 films
French silent films
1920s French-language films
Films directed by Pierre Colombier
Pathé films
French black-and-white films
1920s French films